Marian Mikołaj Łącz (5 December 1921 - 2 August 1984) was a former Polish international footballer who played as a forward, and later a theater and film actor.

Football

Born in Rzeszów, Łącz started his footballing career with his local team Resovia Rzeszów. The outbreak of World War 2 put his footballing career on hold until 1944, when he started playing for Sokół Rzeszów with his brother, Tadeusz. In 1946 he moved to Gdańsk to play for Lechia Gdańsk. He made his Lechia debut on 9 September 1945 against WKS 16 Dyw. Gdańsk in a 9-1 win. While being Łącz's first game for the club, it was also the club's first ever competitive game. He spent 6 months with Lechia, during which time he made 10 appearances and scored 25 goals, scoring six hat-trick in his 10 games and finishing as the club's top scorer for the season. After his time with Lechia he joined ŁKS Łódź. He had a successful time with ŁKS putting in good performances which got him the attention of the Polish media at the time. He helped ŁKS Łódź achieve promotion to the top division in 1948, playing in the I liga for ŁKS in 1949. During his time at ŁKS he proved himself to be a valuable forward finishing as the top scorer in 1948 with 17 goals and 1949 with 18 goals. In 1950 Łącz moved to Warsaw to join Polonia Warsaw, a decision partly made due to Warsaw having the Aleksander Zelwerowicz National Academy. While with Polonia he again showed his goal-scoring prowess, finishing as the club's top scorer in 1951 and 1952. In 1952 Polonia were both relegated from the I liga and won the Polish Cup, beating rivals Legia Warsaw in the final 1-0. It is documented that at times while playing for Polonia he was substituted before half-time so he was able to meet his acting commitments at the theater. He continued to play for Polonia in the II liga until he retired to focus on his acting career in 1956.

Łącz made three international appearances for Poland, making his debut on 8 May 1949 against Romania. The other two games came in 1950, against Hungary and Czechoslovakia, with all three of his international caps coming in defeats for Poland.

Acting

He started acting in 1945, performing in the Rzeszów theater. He moved to Łódź and studied at the National Film School in Łódź, eventually moving to Warsaw to perform and study at the Aleksander Zelwerowicz National Academy. After retiring from football his acting roles became more  prevalent. He mainly retired from acting in 1981, but held small roles until his death in 1984.

Personal life

His father was an officer in the army and his mother worked in theater. He had a brother, Tadeusz, who was a footballer, and had two sisters. His daughter, Laura Łącz, is an actress.

Honours

Polonia Warsaw
Polish Cup: 1952

Filmography

A list of TV shows and films Łącz has had a role in.

A list of TV shows and films in which Łącz was part of the cast, but not as an acting role.

References

1921 births
1984 deaths
Resovia (football) players
Lechia Gdańsk players
ŁKS Łódź players
Polonia Warsaw players
Polish footballers
Poland international footballers
Association football forwards
Polish male stage actors
Polish male television actors
Polish male film actors